Nicole Hammond (born April 26, 2001) is an American tennis player.

She made her main draw debut at the 2018 Citi Open in doubles partnering with Kristýna Nepivodová. The pair qualified after winning the Wild Card Challenge tournament.

Hammond is verbally committed to playing college tennis at the University of Michigan.

References

American female tennis players
Living people
2001 births
21st-century American women
Michigan Wolverines women's tennis players